Hans Flierl (born 19 October 1885 in Forchheim, died 21 August 1974 in Erlangen) was a German jurist and local politician. From 1929 to 1934 he was the mayor of Erlangen.

Biography 
After graduating from high school in Schweinfurt, Hans Flierl studied law and political science at the universities of Erlangen, Berlin and Munich. In 1904 he became a member of the Corps Bavaria Erlangen. In 1907 he received his doctorate in law. After he had passed the Bavarian examination for the higher judicial and administrative service in 1910, he initially worked as a lawyer for several years. In 1915 he was appointed state attorney in Landshut and in 1918 legal council in Erlangen. One year later, in 1919, he was elected 2nd Mayor and in July 1929 1st Mayor of the city of Erlangen. In 1932 his title was changed to lord mayor. He remained in office until succeeded by Nazi Party member Alfred Groß in 1934.

The focus of his political work was public welfare and the reorganization of the municipal administration after World War I.

Awards and Recognitions 
 1932: Appointed honorary citizen of the University of Erlangen
 1962: Appointed honorary citizen of the city of Erlangen

References

1885 births
1974 deaths
Mayors of Erlangen